Tut Kaleh-ye Olya (also Romanized as Tūt Kaleh-ye ‘Olyā; also known as Tūt Kalā and Tūt Kalā-ye ‘Olyā) is a village in Reza Mahalleh Rural District, in the Central District of Rudsar County, Gilan Province, Iran. At the 2006 census, its population was 180, in 54 families.

References 

Populated places in Rudsar County